Creobroter apicalis is an Asian species of praying mantids in the tribe Hymenopodini.

References

External links

Creobroter
Mantodea of Asia
Hymenopodidae
Insects described in 1869